The Joongdong Educational Foundation (학교법인 중동학원) is a private school corporation that operates Joongdong High School and Joongdong Middle School. Founded in 1906 as the Joongdong School (중동학교), the Joongdong Foundation was brought to its current form in 1948.

History

For 17 years (1994–2011), the Samsung Group funded the Joongdong Foundation for 17, bringing it up as a leading private school corporation in South Korea.

Currently, the foundation operates 2 schools and is led by a board of trustees that consists of 7 members. The chairman of the board is Kim Duck-soo.

Current Board of Trustees

References

네이버 백과사전 http://100.naver.com/100.nhn?docid=821236,
경향신문 1994년 3월 27일,
동아일보 http://news.donga.com/3/all/20111020/41272405/1
학교법인 중동학원 www.joongdong.org
중동학원

Education in South Korea
Educational organizations based in South Korea